Kiến Xương is a township and capital of Kiến Xương District, Thái Bình Province, Vietnam.

References

Populated places in Thái Bình province
District capitals in Vietnam
Townships in Vietnam